Elizabeth Stewart, Princess of Scotland was a daughter of Robert II of Scotland and Euphemia de Ross. She was born between 1356 and 1370, well after her parents' marriage on 2 May 1355. Her brothers were David Stewart, Earl of Strathearn and Walter Stewart, Earl of Atholl, and her half-brother was Robert III of Scotland.

She married David Lindsay on 22 February 1375. Her dowry was the barony of Strathnairn in Inverness-shire. In 1398, her father granted Lindsay the title of Earl of Crawford. They had seven, possibly eight, children:
 Gerard Lindsay (d. before 1421)
 Ingram Lindsay, Bishop of Aberdeen (d. 1458)
 Marjorie Lindsay, married Sir William Douglas. They were parents of Catherine Douglas.
 Alexander Lindsay, 2nd Earl of Crawford (c. 1387–1438)
 David Lindsay, Lord of Newdosk (1407–?); he later became a priest
 Elizabeth Lindsay; she married Sir Robert Keith.
 Elizabeth Lindsay (1407–?); married Robert Erskine, 1st Lord Erskine ; she may have been confused with her sister of the same name, and it is possible that they were one and the same person.
 Isabella Lindsay (1407–?), married Sir John Maxwell of Pollok, and had issue.

They presumably lived at Crawford Castle.

References 

Elizabeth
Scottish countesses
Scottish princesses
Year of birth unknown
14th-century births
15th-century deaths
Year of death unknown
Elizabeth
14th-century Scottish people
15th-century Scottish people
14th-century Scottish women
15th-century Scottish women
Daughters of kings